Xavier Iván Báez Gamiño (born 22 July 1987) is a Mexican professional footballer who plays as a defensive midfielder.

Career 
Báez debuted with Chivas on 17 April 2007 against Atlante in a 3–0 win for the Rojiblancos. He played four times for Chivas in the Clausura 2007 Tournament, and scored his first goal on April 21, 2007, in a 9–0 win over Veracruz. He was loaned to Toluca in 2013 before he was transferred to Cruz Azul as an exchange for the services of Omar Bravo ahead of the 2014 Clausura. Báez was always in the starring lineup for Cruz Azul in the Clausura 2014 and the Apertura 2014. It was confirmed by both clubs that Baez will be joining Club Necaxa for the Clausura 2016.
In October 2018, he joined USL Championship expansion side Austin Bold on a three-year deal.

Honours
Guadalajara
InterLiga: 2009

Cruz Azul
CONCACAF Champions League: 2013–14

Necaxa
Ascenso MX: 15-16
Copa MX: 2018

References

External links 
 
 

1987 births
Living people
People from Reynosa
Footballers from Tamaulipas
Association football midfielders
Mexican footballers
C.D. Guadalajara footballers
Deportivo Toluca F.C. players
Cruz Azul footballers
Club Necaxa footballers
Liga MX players
Austin Bold FC players
USL Championship players